Boi or BOI may refer to:

People
 Paolo Boi (1528–1598), Italian chess player
 Big Boi (born 1975), rapper
 Boi-1da (born 1986), Canadian hip-hop producer
 Boi, one of the Catalan forms of the name Baudilus

Places
 Boí, a village in Catalonia, Spain
 Boi, Khyber Pakhtunkhwa, a village and union council in Pakistan
 Sant Boi de Llobregat, a town near Barcelona, Spain
 Sant Boi de Lluçanès, a town in Osona, Catalonia
 Boise Airport (IATA: BOI, FAA LID: BOI), an airport in the US state of Idaho

Organizations
 The Bank of Industry (BOI), Nigeria's oldest development finance institution
 Board of Investment of Mauritius, the investment promotion agency of Mauritius
 Pakistan Board of Investment, the investment promotion agency of Pakistan
 Bureau of Investigation, a bureau of the U.S. Dept. of Justice, became the Federal Bureau of Investigation in 1935
 Bank of Ireland, one of Ireland's largest commercial banks
 Bank of India, one of India's largest commercial banks
 Thailand Board of Investment, an agency of the Government of Thailand to promote investment in Thailand

Music and film
 "Sk8er Boi", a 2002 song by Avril Lavigne
 Boi (music), a style of Central Amazon folk music
 Boi (film), a 2019 Spanish thriller

Other
 BOI, the ICAO code for 2GO
 Boi (slang), as a spelling that is deliberately altered for reasons of gender identification, sexuality, or group affinity
 Bôi River, Vietnam
 Dat Boi, an internet meme that features an animated frog riding a unicycle

See also
 Boy (disambiguation)
 Sant Boi (disambiguation)
 Boii, an Iron Age Gallic tribe 
 Boii (genus)